Baniapara is a village in Kamrup rural district, in the state of Assam, India, situated in south bank of river Brahmaputra.

Transport
The village is near National Highway 31  and connected to nearby towns and cities like Chaygaon and Guwahati with regular buses and other modes of transportation.

See also
 Bangalipara
 Bamunigaon

References

Villages in Kamrup district